Serginho "Sergio" van Dijk (born 6 August 1982) is a former professional footballer who played as a striker. He was the top goal scorer in the 2010–11 A-League regular season and made a name for himself in Australian football for his prolific scoring tally. Born in the Netherlands, he represented the Indonesia national team.

Early life 
Van Dijk was named after the Brazilian star, Serginho Chulapa, who played for Brazil during the 1982 World Cup. His mother was a big fan of Brazil at the time. Van Dijk is of Dutch-Indonesian parentage.

Club career

Netherlands 
Van Dijk started his career at local club LTC in Assen before he was drafted into the FC Groningen youth academy. In the 2000–01 season he played two matches (one goal) for Groningen in the Eerste Divisie, helping them to gain promotion. In the Eredivisie he did not play for Groningen and he moved back to the Eerste Divisie with Helmond Sport in 2002. In 2005, he moved to FC Emmen, where he scored 18 and 12 goals in his first two seasons. In the 2007–08 season he played at Emmen alongside his brother Danny.

Brisbane Roar 
On 16 June 2008, Van Dijk signed a two-year contract with Queensland Roar (now operating as Brisbane Roar) after impressing the Roar scouts with his technique at the end of May against Redlands United and a Gold Coast Select XI.

Van Dijk started off the season slowly, only scoring one goal in his first ten matches although managing six assists at the time. However he then silenced the critics by scoring nine goals in as many matches (including a brace against the Central Coast Mariners). On 17 January 2009, van Dijk was the Roar's first ever player to score a hat-trick in their 3–1 win over Sydney FC.

Adelaide United 
On 11 February 2010, Van Dijk signed for Adelaide United on a six-month contract for the club's AFC Champions League campaign, and made his debut against defending Asian champions, Pohang Steelers on 24 February 2010, in a 1–0 win at Hindmarsh Stadium. Van Dijk made his scoring debut for the Reds in their 2–0 away win against Shandong Luneng on matchday 2 of the Champions League campaign.

On 14 March 2010, van Dijk agreed to a three-year contract with Adelaide United. On 21 January 2011, he scored a hat-trick in the team's 8–1 win over North Queensland Fury. He won the Golden Boot award for the 2010–11 season with 16 goals.

Van Dijk was released from Adelaide United in January 2013.

Persib Bandung 
In February 2013 van Dijk signed for Indonesian Super League club Persib Bandung. He scored on his debut in a 2–1 loss to Persisam Samarinda. On 3 March, he scored again twice, in a 3–1 win over Persija Jakarta.

Sepahan 
Van Dijk signed a contract with Sepahan in December 2013, effective from 1 January 2014 to play for the team in the Iran Pro League and AFC Champions League.

Suphanburi 
On 30 June 2014, van Dijk signed for Thai Premier League club Suphanburi, for a two-year contract.

Adelaide United 
After two productive seasons with Suphanburi, van Dijk returned to former club Adelaide United as their Asian player for the 2016 AFC Champions League campaign. On 9 February 2016, he made his sole appearance for Adelaide in their short-lived campaign, coming off the bench as a substitute against Shandong Luneng, in the third qualifying round play-off at Hindmarsh Stadium. Despite receiving a raucous reception from the home crowd, and producing a strong performance reminiscent of his previous spell with Adelaide, van Dijk and the Reds were barrelled out of the competition, 2–1, bringing van Dijk's contract to an end.

Persib Bandung 
After being clubless and trained with his former club FC Emmen, he finally decided to come back to Persib Bandung and was re-united with former Adelaide United colleague Marcos Flores. Due to an injury he made only four league appearances.

VV-Pelikaan-S 
Van Dijk joined the Dutch league amateur club VV-Pelikaan-S.

International career 
On 19 July 2010, it was reported that van Dijk was to declare for Indonesia, the country of origin of one of his grandparents. However, upon meeting with the Indonesian football authorities, he learned that in order to be able to represent Indonesia, he must earn Indonesian citizenship and give up his Dutch citizenship, as Indonesia does not allow dual citizenship. He refused to decide his international future, citing that it is difficult for him to give up his Dutch citizenship because his wife and their families are Dutch. He eventually decided to revoke his Dutch citizenship in order to play for Indonesia.  The Football Association of Indonesia announced that van Dijk was being naturalized, so that he could play in the 2014 FIFA World Cup qualification campaign.
On 4 March 2013, he was called up for the first time, in a 2015 Asia Cup qualifier. He made his debut against Saudi Arabia on 23 March 2013.

Personal life 
Van Dijk has a young son, who lives with family in the Netherlands. Regarding his future in football, van Dijk has said, "...after all these years of being overseas, it’s my eighth year now, I think it’s also time to let the family choose what the future plans are."

Van Dijk also operates a clothing label with his brother Danny, called Sixlovesnine.

Career statistics

Club

International 

Scores and results list Indonesia' goal tally first, score column indicates score after each van Dijk goal.

Honours 
Individual
 A-League Golden Boot: 2010–11

References

External links
 
 

1982 births
Living people
People from Assen
Indonesian footballers
Indonesia international footballers
Dutch footballers
Dutch people of Indonesian descent
Indonesian people of Dutch descent
Indo people
Naturalised citizens of Indonesia
Dutch emigrants to Indonesia
Association football forwards
Marquee players (A-League Men)
Eredivisie players
Eerste Divisie players
Van Dijk, Sergio
Liga 1 (Indonesia) players
Sergio van Dijk
FC Groningen players
Helmond Sport players
FC Emmen players
Van Dijk, Sergio
Van Dijk, Sergio
Persib Bandung players
Sepahan S.C. footballers
Sergio van Dijk
Indonesian expatriate footballers
Dutch expatriate footballers
Dutch expatriate sportspeople in Australia
Indonesian expatriate sportspeople in Australia
Expatriate soccer players in Australia
Dutch expatriate sportspeople in Thailand
Indonesian expatriate sportspeople in Thailand
Expatriate footballers in Thailand
Dutch expatriate sportspeople in Iran
Expatriate footballers in Iran
Dutch fashion designers
Footballers from Drenthe